Temoc  (/tēˌmäk/) is the name of the official mascot of The University of Texas at Dallas, while the student body are known collectively as the Comets. He is an anthropomorphic astronomical being created to represent a "comet in a human form". Temoc is depicted with icey bluish-white skin, a muscular physique, a strong cartoony smile (with no nose), fiery orange hair, and has black laced boots with a comet icon on the side. He is usually seen wearing UT Dallas branded orange and green t-shirts paired with gym shorts.

UTD athletic teams first officially used the mascot name "Comets" in 1981.  Temoc, the mascot character, was created and later officially recognized by the university in 1998. The official specialty Temoc logo was adopted by the university in 2017.

Temoc is often seen at varsity sports games, on-campus events, and graduation ceremonies and will typically pose for pictures. Additionally, he participates with the UT Dallas cheerleaders and Power Dancers team to boost school spirit.

Annual auditions are held to select students to wear the Temoc costume. However, the identity of those who wear the mascot suit is kept secret, only to be unveiled during a graduation commencement in an event known as "Temoc Reveal". Former student mascot representatives that graduate will wear Temoc's costume gloves (hands) with their cap and gown as they walk across the stage to accept their diplomas.

History

Name Changes 
UTD's mascot was originally named "Blaze". However, the university was forced to change it after a copyright dispute was filed by UT Arlington, whose mascot shared the same name. Temoc was unanimously chosen by the UTD Student Government Association in 2002, which was crafted by spelling "comet" backwards.

In 2009, the Student Government ran several rounds of online polls to change Temoc's name again. The ballot included “Scorch,” “Force,” “Striker”, and “Crusher,” along with a write-in option. Scorch won with 42% of the vote, while the write-in Temoc received 13% of the vote. Despite the overwhelming response in favor of a new name, no action was officially taken.

Birthday Confusion 
The comet character known as Temoc was adopted by UT Dallas on April 20, 1998. He was originally drawn by UTD alumnus Aaron Aryanpur '00 as a submission to a 1998 student mascot art competition (which was held because the university did not have a mascot illustration at the time). As a result, this date is popularly accepted as the mascot's birthday by the student body and alumni.

Yet from 1999 to 2019, UT Dallas did not officially celebrate Temoc's birthday on the correct date. Previously, UTD had annually hosted Temoc's birthday parties on April 18 from 2016 - 2019. Prior to 2016, the mascot's birthday had been celebrated on various dates (typically in April), which include April 3, April 14, and May 1. 2020 was the first documented year that the university officially celebrated their mascot's birthday on April 20 (Temoc's 22nd birthday).

Popular speculation, though not confirmed, suggests that UTD formerly did not celebrate Temoc's birthday on April 20 due to the date's association with cannabis culture. While Temoc's original name was "Blaze" and became UT Dallas' mascot on the same day that 4/20 is observed, Aryanpur claims that any marijuana references were merely coincidental. It is more likely that the college administration initially only recorded their mascot's adoption month, forgot the exact day, and did not plan Temoc's birthday events consistently in advance - resulting in various April days being used for the first two decades.

Awards 
Temoc has won several NCA & NDA mascot awards. These include 2018 Top 2 Mascot, 2019 Most Collegiate Mascot, 2022 All-American Mascot, and 2022 Top 4 NCA Collegiate Mascot.

Assassination Attempts

1st Attempt 
Students, faculty, staff, and alumni began discussion of eliminating the Temoc character (while keeping the Comets as the student body nickname) in the 2007-2008 academic year. An initial poll was sent out and early write-in options included an astronaut, robot, greyhound, and a “Crusher” character. Soon after, the university had begun promoting April 3, 2008 as "Temoc's Final Birthday". In the end, the final poll gave 4 options: a fox, hawk, coyote, or a comet character. "Comet character" won the majority with 50% of the vote, so Temoc continued to remain as the UTD mascot.

2nd Attempt 
In 2009, the Student Government started another campaign to replace mascot. An initial poll concluded that over 70% of students wanted choose a new mascot, which became a clear indication of Temoc's unpopularity.

At the end of a lengthy exploratory research, a final poll created by a special council was given to the student body. Students were given the option to vote to keep Temoc or to change the mascot to a man in a spacesuit. Temoc won the poll by a landslide. However, Temoc's win was mainly attributed to confusion based the spaceman's poor illustration - not the desire to keep the original mascot around.

Over the past decade, Temoc has seen an increase in popularity with the UTD student body. The figure has become an icon of UTD and has integrated into the culture of the university.

Mascot Suit Change 

The original 1999 Temoc mascot costume is displayed in a glass box at the Visitor's Center. The current costume design was created in 2008 and is still in use today.

Backwards Naming Conventions at UTD

Temoc 
Temoc is "comet" spelled backwards. While the UT Dallas student body had been collectively referred to as the "Comets" well before the mascot's official creation in 1998, Temoc officially solidified the college's association with the astronomical symbol.

The name "Temoc" was created and chosen by UTD's 2002 Student Body Government. The group had hastily compromised on writing the mascot's new name as "comet" backwards because they were under pressure to quickly come up with an alternative name to replace the original (Blaze) on a short notice (due to a legal warning from UT Arlington).

This decision was regarded as incredibly uncreative - a consequence largely attributed by the fact that the majority of the student population was majoring in a STEM area (as opposed to the arts) at the time. As a result, the student body now often refers to various points of interest on campus by their backwards spelling. Essentially, making fun of Temoc's ridiculous name is the sole reason why UT Dallas students still utilize backwards names to this day.

Enarc 
Enarc is "crane" spelled backwards. It refers to any construction crane that resides on the main campus. Because UT Dallas has been in a period of rapid growth and development in the past decade, cranes have become an iconic moving landmark on campus.

Tobor 
Tobor is "robot" spelled backwards. It refers to the automated food delivery robots that roam the sidewalks of the UTD campus. The robots are managed by Starship Technologies.

"Comets" Mascot Origin 

While Temoc (the illustrated & suited comet mascot) was created in 1998, UT Dallas had officially started calling its athletic teams the "Comets" beginning in January 1981. The name was chosen by the student body and later officially confirmed in December 1980 by the college Regents along with the official school colors (forest green, orange, white) and the official new student newspaper name (The Mercury). This coincided with other recent student life improvements, including the construction of the Student Center and first campus strategic plan.

Published in the UTD Mercury Vol. 1 No. 3 on September 29, 1980, a simple cut-out survey on Page 8 asked UT Dallas students to submit their vote for the mascot name with the following options:

 Armadillos
 Comets
 Suns
 Titans
 Unicorns

The 5 options were selected by a special six person committee from a pool of write-in recommendations submitted by the student body and faculty. Other mascot suggestions included: Aardvarks, Crickets, Fighting Cocks, Rattlers, Wolves, Scorpions, Possums, Chipmunks, Buzzards, Demons, Sludge Monsters, Gladiators, Klingons, Toros, Rangers, Wranglers, Sagebrush Rebels, Chaparrals, Androids, Creatures from the UTD Lagoon, Texas Instruments, Space Cadets, Fat Cats, Roadsters, Prisoners, Commuters, Aggies, Thermometers, and Graduates.

After the poll concluded, The Mercury wrote that "Comets" was one of the "top 3" most popular options and was ultimately chosen by the special committee to be adopted as the official athletic name. However the final tally of the vote was not published, so it is likely that the mascot name that won the student body popular vote was not selected.

While the exact origins behind the "Comets" mascot name is unknown, The Mercury published that it was influenced by "[university] activities accented heavily by space research".

UT Dallas' involvement with space research was largely supported by its first acting President, Dr. Francis "Frank" Johnson. He noted that out of the three departments that existed in the institution that preceded UTD in 1961-68 (Geosciences, Molecular Biology, and Space & Atmospheric Physics), space research was the easiest to secure government grants for while all other areas heavily relied on dwindling private philanthropy. Dr. Johnson claimed that without initial funds received from NASA (largely fueled by the USA vs USSR Cold War Space Race), the fledgling university would have not been able to secure enough financial resources to continue to operate. Successful space research and collaborations helped legitimize the young graduate center's value and eventually gained enough support from Texas legislature to bring it under official state support by adding the institution to the University of Texas System in 1969.

Notable Space Research at UTD 
Since its founding, astrophysics and space research has played a key role in UT Dallas' early research prowess and is intertwined with many of the college's traditions. Several UTD faculty members and alumni's groundbreaking contributions to space science helped develop the university's current space-themed school spirit.

 Dr. James L. Carter was one of the UT Dallas geoscientists that trained Apollo astronauts to spot interesting geology on the moon and also analyzed the lunar samples that came back. He created lunar regolith simulant (aka fake "moon dirt"), which is so chemically, mineralogically, and textually similar to the real thing that the two are practically indistinguishable. NASA has ordered over 50 tons of the material to use for testing space equipment and other research projects. All UTD class rings are surrounded by the same lunar regolith simulant material the night before the official Ring Ceremony to symbolize the university's past and future.
 Dr. James Reilly was the first UT Dallas alumni to become an astronaut for NASA. He has spent a combined 853 hours in space, including five spacewalks lasting more than 31 hours during which he helped assemble the International Space Station. Upon returning from his final mission, Reilly presented UTD a framed collage commemorating the flight along with a UT Dallas flag that made the trip to space. The gifts are currently displayed on the 4th floor of UT Dallas' Eugene McDermott Library.
 Dr. John Hoffman designed and built mass spectrometers and other equipment to explore Venus, the moon, and Halley's Comet and played a key role in discovering the existence of water on Mars.
 Dr. Lloyd V. Berkner joined the institution that would become UTD in 1961 and became well renowned in the scientific community for his studies of the Earth's ionosphere and magnetosphere. In 1966, NASA gave Berkner its highest civilian award, the Public Service Medal, for his contributions to U.S. space programs.
 Dr. Francis S. Johnson, an expert on the Earth's upper atmosphere, designed atmospheric pressure testing devices that flew on Apollo flights 12, 14, and 15 to detect the existence of a lunar atmosphere in for the first manned lunar landings.
 Dr. Michael Kesden and Nobel Laureate Dr. Russell Hulse both directly contributed to the first discovery and detection of gravitational waves (ripples in the fabric of space and time).
 Dr. John H.L. Hansen and a team of UTD researchers digitized thousands of hours of audio from the Apollo missions. The historical audio data was preserved from NASA's original 1960s single-track audio playback machine (SoundScriber) that used multiple boxes of 1-inch tapes. Without these efforts, most of the documented communications from the world's first space missions would have been lost to time.

References

External links
UT Dallas Temoc

College mascots in the United States
University of Texas at Dallas